Ninety Seconds is an Irish science fiction neo-noir short film directed by Gerard Lough and starring Andrew Norry, Michael Parle, Claire Blennerhassett and Emma Eliza Regan. It premiered at the Underground Cinema Film Festival in Dublin on 9 August 2012.

Synopsis 
The film is set in the near future where surveillance experts known as "Techs" take on morally dubious assignments for wealthy clients. Mark and his new assistant Ralfi are the best in their field. They quickly sense something is out of place when they are hired by shifty businessman Philips for an unusual assignment that will lead them into a world of paranoia, intrigue and revenge.

Critical reception and release 
Geeks of Doom reviewed the film, stating that they were "instantly intrigued by its darkness shot through with cool music, nifty graphics, and well-placed blindingly bright lights." The Irish Examiner also reviewed the short, citing its "superb soundtrack" as a highlight.

After screenings at several film festivals, the film was released online on 11 February 2013.

References

External links 

 Trailer

Cyberpunk films
Irish short films
2012 films
Irish science fiction films
2012 short films
2010s English-language films